Richard Bowman may refer to:

Dick Bowman (1930–1983), American football player and coach
Richard Bowman (cricketer) (1934–2005), English cricketer
Richard Irving Bowman (1918–2001), American painter
Richie Bowman (born 1954), English footballer